The Amherst Ultimate Invitational Tournament is the oldest high school Ultimate Frisbee tournament in the United States. The first tournament was played in 1992. Each year, 30 highly competitive teams from the Northeast converge on Amherst. The current champions (2018) are Amherst Regional High School (boys) and H-B Woodlawn (girls). In 2010, the tournament hosted thirty teams, with twenty being made up of boys, and ten for girls.

References

1992 establishments in Massachusetts
Recurring sporting events established in 2006
Ultimate (sport) competitions
High school sports in Massachusetts
Sports in Amherst, Massachusetts
Sports competitions in Massachusetts